Crawford-Winslow House is a historic home located at Crown Point, Lake County, Indiana, USA. It was built in 1890, and is a 2½-story, Queen Anne style frame dwelling with a cross gable roof with fishscale shingles. It features a corner tower with conical roof, wraparound porch, and leaded glass windows. Also on the property is a contributing garage (c. 1910).

It was listed in the National Register of Historic Places in 2013.

References

Houses on the National Register of Historic Places in Indiana
Queen Anne architecture in Indiana
Houses completed in 1890
Buildings and structures in Lake County, Indiana
National Register of Historic Places in Lake County, Indiana
1890 establishments in Indiana